PrimeraAir Nordic SIA was a leisure airline headquartered in Riga, Latvia owned by the Primera Travel Group. It provided scheduled and charter passenger services to leisure destinations from Northern Europe. It ceased operations on 2 October 2018.

History 
The airline was founded in 2014 by the Primera Travel Group to complement the Danish based Primera Air Scandinavia. The company also opened a Network Control Center in Riga for overseeing all operational matters of both Primera Air Scandinavia and Primera Air Nordic. Hrafn Thorgeirsson was appointed as the new CEO of both airlines.

On 30 September 2018, Primera Air Group announced that the company was declaring bankruptcy and that the operations of both Primera Air and Primera Air Nordic would cease effective 2 October 2018, after failing to secure long term financing.

Destinations

Fleet 

At the time of Primera Air Nordic's bankruptcy on 1 October 2018, the fleet consisted of the following aircraft:

References

External links 

Official website

Defunct airlines of Latvia
Airlines established in 2014
Airlines disestablished in 2018
2014 establishments in Latvia
2018 disestablishments in Latvia
Latvian companies established in 2014